Włodzimierz Jan Zawadzki (born 28 September 1967 in Polany, Poland) is a Polish sport wrestler. He is a member of MZKS Orzeł Wierzbica (1980–1987) and Legia Warszawa (since 1987).

He was a gold medalist at the 1996 Summer Olympics in Atlanta in the Men's Featherweight (57-62 kg) category. Medalist of wrestling world championships (silver: 1995, 2002; bronze: 1994, 1997), wrestling European championships (gold: 1991, 1995, 1999; bronze: 2001).

For his sport achievements, he received: 
 Knight's Cross of the Order of Polonia Restituta (5th Class) in 1996.

References
sports-reference

External links
 

1967 births
Living people
Olympic gold medalists for Poland
Wrestlers at the 1992 Summer Olympics
Wrestlers at the 1996 Summer Olympics
Wrestlers at the 2000 Summer Olympics
Polish male sport wrestlers
Wrestlers at the 2004 Summer Olympics
Olympic medalists in wrestling
People from Radom County
Sportspeople from Masovian Voivodeship
Medalists at the 1996 Summer Olympics
20th-century Polish people
21st-century Polish people